Nehorai Ifrah (born 7 May 2003) is an Israeli professional footballer who plays as a forward for Hapoel Hadera, on loan from Maccabi Haifa.

Honours 

Maccabi Haifa
 Israeli Premier League (1): 2020–21
 Israel Super Cup (1): 2021

References

External links

2003 births
Living people
Israeli footballers
Footballers from Tiberias
Association football forwards
Maccabi Haifa F.C. players
Hapoel Afula F.C. players
Hapoel Hadera F.C. players
Ironi Tiberias F.C. players
Israeli Premier League players
Liga Leumit players
Israeli people of Moroccan-Jewish descent